Qalat (also Romanized as Qalāt) is a village in Tujerdi Rural District, Sarchehan District, Bavanat County, Fars Province, Iran. At the 2006 census, its population was 146, in 34 families.

References 

Populated places in Sarchehan County